Émile Ilboudo  is a Burkinabé politician and diplomat.

He has served as the Ambassador of Burkina Faso in Côte d'Ivoire.

References

Burkinabé politicians
Year of birth missing (living people)
Living people
Ambassadors of Burkina Faso to Ivory Coast
21st-century Burkinabé people